is a Japanese animator, character designer, and anime director. His directorial works include Grenadier, Majin Tantei Nōgami Neuro, Kiba, Rainbow - Nisha Rokubō no Shichinin and the 2011 anime adaptation of Hunter × Hunter. He is a member of the Japanese Animation Creators Association. He joined Studio Live in 1982, and following the death of Toyoo Ashida, became the head of the company in 2011.

Filmography

TV series
 Dancouga – Super Beast Machine God (1985) - Character design
 City Hunter '91 (1991) - Character design
 Gulliver Boy (1995) - Character design
 Pluster World (2003–2004) - Character design
 Area 88 (2004) - Character design
 Grenadier (2004–2005) - Director (Debut directorial work)
 Kiba (2006–2007) - Director
 Neuro: Supernatural Detective (2007–2008) - Director
 Rainbow: Nisha Rokubō no Shichinin (2010) - Director
 Hunter × Hunter (second series) (2011–2014) - Director
The Vampire Dies in No Time (2021–present) - Director

Films
Ryoma! Rebirth: The Prince of Tennis Movie (2021) - Director

OVAs/ONAs
 Dancouga: Requiem for Victims (1986) - Character design
 Amon: The Darkside of The Devilman (2000) - Character design

Video games
 Pluster World ~Legendary Plust Gate~ (2003) - Character design
 Pluster World ~Pluston GP~ (2003) - Character design
 Pluster World ~Legendary Plust Gate EX~ (2003) - Character design

References

 Book references

External links

People from Kumamoto
1963 births
Anime directors
Sunrise (company) people
Madhouse (company) people
Living people